Manajanabo is a town and consejo popular (“popular council”) in Santa Clara, Cuba. Manajanabo lies on the Minerva Lake.

Geography 
Manajanabo Popular Council borders Sakenaf, Escambray, Vigía Sandino, Universidad, and Camilo Cienfuegos.

Notable People 
 Gerardo Machado, president of Cuba from 1925–33

References 

Populated places in Villa Clara Province